Üröm is a village in Pest county, Hungary. In 2008, the population was 6,790.

References

Populated places in Pest County
Burial sites of the House of Holstein-Gottorp-Romanov